The Centre for Research on Multinational Corporations (SOMO–), is an independent, non-profit research and network organisation working on social, ecological and economic issues related to sustainable development. Since 1973, the organisation investigates multinational corporations and the consequences of their activities for people and the environment around the world.

SOMO has expertise in:
 Sectors and value chains
 Corporate research
 Corporate accountability
 Economic reform

The main sectors under research by SOMO are the electronics, energy & water, minerals, agriculture & food, clothing, pharmaceuticals and the financial sectors.

History

Establishment 
In the early 1970s, large groups of Dutch people declared themselves in solidarity with the reform politics of the Chilean President Allende. At the time, the process of democratising the Chilean economy was threatened by the manipulations of multinational - mainly American - corporations with interests in Chile. The violent overthrow of the Allende government in 1973 elicited mass fury against the multinationals. Several Third World organisations and sympathisers decided to establish a research bureau to monitor the activities and interests of these multinational companies. This led, in 1973, to the establishment of Centre for Research on Multinational Corporations (SOMO). Two of the organisations involved in setting up SOMO were X-Y Beweging and Sjaloom.

X-Y and Sjaloom originally financed the wages and other costs of the first researcher. Later on, the growing SOMO organisation was funded for many years partly by subsidies from NCO (now NCDO).

In its early days, SOMO’s main focus was on developing countries. However, from 1975 on, SOMO carried out research in support of workers in the Netherlands who were employed by multinational companies. SOMO provided publications and training for works councils and trade union executive groups of almost all the major multinationals which had their head offices in the Netherlands. Many SOMO employees acted as experts for works councils of Dutch companies during restructuring, mergers and reorganisations.

The rise of European Works Councils (EWCs) meant that – logically – SOMO had acquired a new, related, field of operation. Drawing up company profiles of multinational companies and providing support in setting up EWCs became a core field of SOMO in the 1980s and 1990s. Research into multinational companies and the business sectors dominated by them was also becoming an important field for research.

Change of work 
Around the turn of the millennium, work for the works councils decreased, leaving primarily the work focusing on developing countries. Since the end of the 1990s, research work has focused primarily on the themes of Corporate Social Responsibility, labour relationships in developing countries and international trade and investment. Commissions are obtained via subsidies issued by the Dutch government and European government bodies. SOMO’s commissioning parties are trade unions, development organisations and other social organisations.

Establishing networks 
The development of the internet is ensuring a wide availability of information, which has meant that the role of SOMO has changed since the 1990s. The added value of SOMO is, on the one hand, carrying out (or commissioning) research into production and labour conditions in various production chains, and on the other on strengthening cooperation between organisations which want to influence businesses and policymakers. By combining research and network coordination, SOMO wants to promote the integration of knowledge and action. SOMO coordinates various networks (CSR Platform, OECD Watch, Coalition for Trade and Development, GoodElectronics). SOMO also represents various consortia (makeITfair and Towards Tax Justice) and is also involved in the European Coalition for Corporate Justice (ECCJ) and Tax Justice Network NL. As an extension of its research and network coordination, SOMO is also focusing more and more on increasing the capacity of southern NGOs (by organising workshops, training courses and developing research methods) and coordinating lobbying and influencing policy.

In the period 2005-2010, the focus was on working conditions and the environment in production sectors, along with initiatives covering economic themes, such as ‘tax justice’ and reforming the financial markets.

From 2010 
The intended objectives of SOMO were reformulated in 2010:
 The influence of social organisations on multinationals is growing.
 The policy and practice of businesses serve sustainable and social development.
 Government regulation is targeted at a fair distribution of prosperity and sustainability.

Networks

Networks coordinated by SOMO 

 GoodElectronics
 Lobbywatch
 MVO Platform
 OECD Watch

 Tax Justice Nederland

Member of steering committee 
 European Coalition of Corporate Justice (ECCJ)
 Ta

 Agribusiness Accountability Initiative
 Banktrack
 Clean Clothes Campaign
 Dutch Working Group on Sustainable Natural Stone
 GATS Platform
 European Association of Development Research and Training Institutes (EADI)
 European Coalition for Corporate Justice (ECCJ)
 Our World is Not For Sale
 Red Puentes
 Regulate Global Finance Now
 Seattle to Brussels Network
 Sociaal Forum Nederland
 The Global Union Research Network
 The Northern Alliance for Sustainability (ANPED)
 Tropical Commodity Coalition
 Werkgroep Duurzame Natuursteen

References

External links 
 

Foundations based in the Netherlands
Organisations based in Amsterdam
Research institutes in the Netherlands
Social responsibility organizations
1973 establishments in the Netherlands
Organizations established in 1973